Javier Moreno may refer to:

 Javi Moreno (footballer, born 1974), Spanish footballer and manager
 Javi Moreno (footballer, born 1997), Spanish footballer
 Javi Moreno (footballer, born 2000), Spanish footballer
 Javier Moreno (politician) (born 1965), Spanish politician and Member of the European Parliament
 Javier Moreno (cyclist) (born 1984), Spanish professional racing cyclist
 Javier Moreno (journalist) (born 1963), Spanish journalist and former director of El País;